Brynjulf Blix (born December 20, 1951) is a Norwegian pianist. Known from his collaboration with Terje Rypdal, Blix received broader notoriety as a member of the group Alex, supporting the singer Alex Naumik. Blix is also known for his  knowledge of electronic music and computer science. He has worked as a computer journalist for DinSide. He has withdrawn from performing, concentrating on his writing, though he has appeared in Norway with the band PATEYs PIPE.

Discography
 Terje Rypdal: Odyssey – ECM Records, 1975
 George K Band: Let's Move Together – Private Stock Records, 1977
 Anita Skorgan (LPs, albums) – Snowflake Skandinavisk Artist Produksjon, 1978
 Lion & The Lamb: Lion & The Lamb (LP, album) – Polydor, 1978
 Alex: Alex' Beste – Polydor, 1981
 Terje Wiik: Wiikend A Go Go (LP, album) – Limbo Musikkproduksjon, 1984
 BANG 85: The Further You Go (LP, album) – Spider Records, 1985
 Guttorm Guttormsen Quartet: Soturnudi & Albufeira – Plastic Strip, 2008

References

External links

20th-century Norwegian pianists
21st-century Norwegian pianists
Norwegian jazz pianists
Norwegian jazz composers
ECM Records artists
Musicians from Oslo
1951 births
Living people